Louise Sherwood McDowell (29 September 1876 - 6 July 1966) was an American physicist and educator. She spent most of her career as a professor of physics at Wellesley College and is best known for being one of the first female scientists to work at the United States Bureau of Standards, now the National Institute of Standards and Technology.

Early life and education
Louise McDowell was born in Wayne, New York, to Francis Marion and Eva (Sherwood) McDowell. McDowell received her B.A. in 1898 from Wellesley College. Following graduation she worked as a high school teacher of English, science, and mathematics until 1905. 

She was then admitted to Cornell University. The chair of the physics department, Edward Nichols was supportive of women in physics. McDowell worked on short-wave radiation under Ernest Merritt. She earned an M.A. in 1907 followed by a Ph.D. in 1909. McDowell attended Cornell at approximately the same time as Frances Wick. The two became friends and later collaborated on research.

Career
After receiving her Ph.D., McDowell returned to work at Wellesley College as an instructor of the physics department in 1909. After Sarah Frances Whiting's retirement, McDowell served as chairman of the physics department until 1945. 

In 1918 during World War I, McDowell took a leave of absence from Wellesley when she was hired by the National Institute of Standards and Technology to conduct research on radar. She was the first female physicist and the first female Ph.D. to work at the institute.

McDowell was a fellow of the American Physical Society and American Association for the Advancement of Science, a member of the Optical Society of America, and vice president for the American Association of Physics Teachers.

References 

1876 births
1966 deaths
Wellesley College alumni
Wellesley College faculty
20th-century American physicists
American women physicists
Cornell University alumni
Fellows of the American Physical Society
Fellows of the American Association for the Advancement of Science
Place of death missing
People from Steuben County, New York
American women academics
20th-century American women scientists